Scrobipalpa caryocoloides is a moth in the family Gelechiidae. It was described by Povolný in 1977. It is found in Korea, Japan and China (Ningxia, Shaanxi).

References

Scrobipalpa
Moths described in 1977
Taxa named by Dalibor Povolný